Pachora - Jamner Passenger is a passenger train belonging to Indian Railways that runs between Pachora Junction to Jamner in India.

It operates as train number 52121 from Pachora Junction to Jamner and as train number 52122 in the reverse direction.

Service
Pachora - Jamner Passenger has a total of 7 halts and 1 Intermediate Stations from Pachora Junction to Jamner and covers a distance of 56 km in 2 hours 5 minutes. The Pachora - Jamner Passenger is a train that comes under Bhusawal Railway Division of Indian Railways.

Routing
The 52121/22 Pachora - Jamner Passenger runs via Varkhedi, Pimpalgaon Bk., Shendurni, Pahur, Bhagdara, to Jamner.

See also
 Indian Railways

References

External links
Pachora - Jamner Time-Table

Slow and fast passenger trains in India
Rail transport in Maharashtra